Brandon Vietti (born in Fresno, California in 1974) is an American animator, director, and producer. Vietti developed and co-produces the animated television show Young Justice with Greg Weisman.  He has also worked on various other animation projects for DC Comics and Warner Bros. Animation. He worked as a director for The Batman and Batman: The Brave and the Bold, directing every third episode.  For his work on The Batman he won an Emmy Award in 2006. He directed the animated film Batman: Under the Red Hood.

Biography 
Vietti attended The Kubert School.

References

American animated film directors
American animated film producers
American television producers
American television directors
American animators
American television writers
American male television writers
American film producers
American storyboard artists
American film directors
1974 births
Living people
Warner Bros. Cartoons people
The Kubert School alumni